Lerwill is a surname. Notable people with the surname include:

Alan Lerwill (born 1946), British former long jumper
Sheila Lerwill (born 1928), British female high jumper

See also
 Gregory Gray (born Paul Lerwill, 1959, Northern Ireland), singer/songwriter
Larwill (disambiguation)